Aghiles Slimani (born August 20, 1982) is an Algerian former swimmer, who specialized in butterfly events. Slimani qualified for two swimming events at the 2004 Summer Olympics in Athens, by posting FINA B-standard entry times of 55.40 (100 m butterfly) and 2:03.18 (200 m butterfly) from the World Championships in Barcelona, Spain. In the 200 m butterfly, Slimani challenged seven other swimmers in heat two, including Olympic veteran Vladan Marković of Serbia. He raced to sixth place and thirty-first overall by 0.16 of a second behind Markovic in 2:04.93. In his second event, 100 m butterfly, Slimani placed forty-eighth on the morning's preliminaries. Swimming in heat three, he edged out Turkey's Onur Uras to take a seventh seed by fifteen hundredths of a second (0.15) in 56.22.

References

External links 
 

1982 births
Living people
Algerian male swimmers
Olympic swimmers of Algeria
Swimmers at the 2004 Summer Olympics
Male butterfly swimmers
21st-century Algerian people